István Rodenbücher (born 22 February 1984 in Szekszárd) is a Hungarian football player of German origin who currently plays for Gárdony VSC.

References

External links
Profile at magyarfutball.hu

HLSZ 

1984 births
Living people
People from Szekszárd
Hungarian footballers
Association football defenders
Hungary international footballers
Hungarian people of German descent
Szekszárdi UFC footballers
MTK Budapest FC players
BFC Siófok players
Ferencvárosi TC footballers
Lombard-Pápa TFC footballers
Nemzeti Bajnokság I players
Sportspeople from Tolna County